Tincture is the limited palette of colours and patterns used in heraldry. The need to define, depict, and correctly blazon the various tinctures is one of the most important aspects of heraldic art and design.

Development and history
The use of tinctures dates back to the formative period of European heraldry in the twelfth and thirteenth centuries. The range of tinctures and the manner of depicting and describing them has evolved over time, as new variations and practices have developed.

The basic scheme and rules of applying the heraldic tinctures dates back to the 12th century. The earliest surviving coloured heraldic illustrations, from the mid-thirteenth century, show the standardized usage of two metals, five colours, and two furs. Since that time, the great majority of heraldic art has employed these nine tinctures.

Over time, variations on these basic tinctures were developed, particularly with respect to the furs. Authorities differ as to whether these variations should be considered separate tinctures, or merely varieties of existing ones. Two additional colours appeared, and were generally accepted by heraldic writers, although they remained scarce, and were eventually termed stains, from the belief that they were used to signify some dishonour on the part of the bearer. The practice of depicting certain charges as they appear in nature, termed proper, was established in the seventeenth century.  Other colours have appeared occasionally since the eighteenth century, especially in continental heraldry, but their use is infrequent, and they have never been regarded as particularly heraldic, or numbered among the tinctures that form the basis of heraldic design.

Frequency and national variants
The frequency with which different tinctures have been used over time has been much observed, but little studied. There are some general trends of note, both with respect to the passage of time, and noted preferences from one region to another.

In medieval heraldry, gules was by far the most common tincture, followed by the metals argent and or, at least one of which necessarily appeared on the majority of arms (see below).  Among the colours, sable was the second most common, followed by azure. Vert, although present from the formative period of heraldic design, was relatively scarce.  Over time, the popularity of azure increased above that of sable, while gules, still the most common, became less dominant.  A survey of French arms granted during the seventeenth century reveals a distinct split between the trends for the arms granted to nobles and commoners. Among nobles, gules remained the most common tincture, closely followed by or, then by argent and azure at nearly equal levels; sable was a very distant fifth choice, while vert remained scarce. Among commoners, azure was easily the most common tincture, followed by or, and only then by gules, argent, and sable, which was used more by commoners than among the nobility; vert, however, was even scarcer in common arms. Purpure is so scarce in French heraldry that some authorities do not regard it as a "real heraldic tincture".

On the whole, French heraldry is known for its use of azure and or, while English heraldry is characterized by heavy use of gules and argent, and unlike French heraldry, it has always made regular use of vert, and occasional, if not extensive, use of purpure. German heraldry is known for its extensive use of or and sable. German and Nordic heraldry rarely make use of purpure or ermine, except in mantling, pavilions, and the lining of crowns and caps. In fact, furs occur infrequently in German and Nordic heraldry.

List

The colours and patterns of the heraldic palette are divided into three groups, usually known as metals, colours, and furs.

Metals
The metals are or and argent, representing gold and silver respectively, although in practice they are often depicted as yellow and white.

Or (Ger. It may be depicted using either yellow or metallic gold, at the artist's discretion; "yellow" has no separate existence in heraldry, and is never used to represent any tincture other than or.

Argent (Ger. Although sometimes depicted as metallic silver or faint grey, it is more often represented by white, in part because of the tendency for silver paint to oxidize and darken over time, and in part because of the pleasing effect of white against a contrasting colour. Notwithstanding the widespread use of white for argent, some heraldic authorities have suggested the existence of white as a distinct heraldic colour.

Colours
Five colours have been recognized since the earliest days of heraldry.  These are: gules, or red; sable, or black; azure, or blue; vert, or green; and purpure, or purple.

Gules (Fr. , Ger. ) is of uncertain derivation; outside of the heraldic context, the modern French word refers to the mouth of an animal.

Sable (Ger. ) is named for a type of marten, known for its dark, luxuriant fur.

both referring to the blue mineral lapis lazuli, used to produce blue pigments.

The alternative name in French, sinople, is derived from the ancient city of Sinope in Asia Minor (Turkey), which was famous for its pigments.

This expensive dye, known from antiquity, produced a much redder purple than the modern heraldic colour; and in fact earlier depictions of purpure are far redder than recent ones. As a heraldic colour, purpure may have originated as a variation of gules.

Stains
Three more tinctures were eventually acknowledged by most heraldic authorities: sanguine, a venous-blood red, murrey, a dark red or mulberry colour; and tenné, an orange or dark yellow to brownish colour.  These were termed "stains" by some of the more influential heraldic writers, and supposed to represent some sort of dishonour on the part of the bearer; but in fact there is no evidence that they were ever so employed, and they probably originated as mere variations of existing colours.  Nevertheless, the belief that they represented stains upon the honour of an armiger served to prevent them receiving widespread use, and it is only in recent times that they have begun to appear on a regular basis.

Sanguine from the Latin , "blood red",  one the so-called "stains" in British armory, is a dark blood red between gules and purpure in hue.  It probably originated as a mere variation of  red and may in fact represent the original hue of purpure, which is now treated as a much bluer colour than when it first appeared in heraldry.  Although long shunned in the belief that it represented some dishonour on the part of the bearer,

Murrey, from the Greek , "mulberry", it has found some use in the twentieth and twenty-first centuries.  Murrey is also the official colour of the Order of the Bath ribbon.

Tenné or tenny, from Latin , "to tan", is the third of the so-called "stains".  It is most often depicted as orange, but sometimes as tawny yellow or brown.  In earlier times it was occasionally used in continental heraldry, but in England largely confined to livery.

Furs

The use of heraldic furs alongside the metals and colours dates to the beginning of the art.  In this earliest period, there were only two furs, ermine and vair. Ermine represents the fur of the stoat, a type of weasel, in its white winter coat, when it is called an ermine. Vair represents the winter coat of the red squirrel, which is blue-grey above and white below.  These furs were commonly used to line the cloaks and robes of the nobility.  Both ermine and vair give the appearance of being a combination of metal and colour, but in heraldic convention they are considered a separate class of tincture that is neither metal nor colour.  Over time, several variations of ermine and vair have appeared, together with three additional furs typically encountered in continental heraldry, known as plumeté, papelonné, and kürsch, the origins of which are more mysterious, but which probably began as variations of vair.

Ermine

Ermine (Fr. , Ger. ) is normally depicted as a white field powdered with black spots, known as "ermine spots", representing the ermine's black tail.  The use of white instead of silver is normal, even when silver is available, since this is how the fur naturally appears; but occasionally silver is used to depict ermine. There is considerable variation in the shape of ermine spots; in the oldest depictions, they were drawn realistically, as long, tapering points; in modern times they are typically drawn as arrowheads, usually topped by three small dots.

Vair

Vair (Ger. ) derives its name from Latin , "variegated".  It is usually depicted as a series of alternating shapes, conventionally known as panes or "vair bells", of argent and azure, arranged in horizontal rows, so that the panes of one tincture form the upper part of the row, while those of the opposite tincture are on the bottom. Succeeding rows are staggered, so that the bases of the panes making up each row are opposite those of the other tincture in the rows above and below.  As with ermine, the argent panes may be depicted as either white or silver; silver is used more often with vair than with ermine, but the natural fur is white.

When the pattern of vair is used with other colours, the field is termed vairé or vairy of the tinctures used.  Normally vairé consists of one metal and one colour, although ermine or one of its variants is sometimes used, with an ermine spot appearing in each pane of that tincture.  Vairé of four colours (Ger. , "gay-coloured" or "checked vair") is also known, usually consisting of two metals and two colours.

Several variant shapes exist, of which the most common is known as potent (Ger. , "upside-down crutch vair"). In this form, the familiar "vair bell" is replaced by a T-shaped figure, known as a "potent" due to its resemblance to a crutch. Other furs sometimes encountered in continental heraldry, which are thought to be derived from vair, include plumeté or plumetty and  papelonné or papellony. In plumeté, the panes are depicted as feathers; in papelonné they are depicted as scales, resembling those of a butterfly's wings (whence the name is derived). These can be modified with the colour, arrangement, and size variants of vair, though those variants are much less common. In German heraldry there is also a fur known as Kürsch, or "vair bellies", consisting of panes depicted hairy and brown.  Here the phrase "vair bellies" may be a misnomer, as the belly of the red squirrel is always white, although its summer coat is indeed reddish brown.

Other tinctures
Several other tinctures are occasionally encountered, usually in continental heraldry:

Cendrée, or "ash-colour";
Brunâtre (Ger. ), or brown, occasionally used in German heraldry, in place of purpure;
Bleu-céleste or bleu de ciel, a sky blue colour intended to be lighter than azure;
Amaranth or columbine, a strong violet-red, found in at least one grant of arms to a Bohemian knight in 1701;
Eisen-farbe, or iron-colour, found in German heraldry

The heraldic scholar A. C. Fox-Davies proposed that, in some circumstances, white should be considered a heraldic colour, distinct from argent.  In a number of instances, a label or collar blazoned as "white" rather than "argent" appears on a supporter blazoned argent or or.  The use of "white" in place of "argent" would be consistent with the Victorian practice of heraldic blazon that discouraged repeating the name of a tincture in describing a coat of arms, but if it were merely intended as a synonym of "argent", this placement would clearly violate the rule against placing metal on metal or colour on colour (see below).  This difficulty is avoided if "white" is considered a colour in this particular instance, rather than a synonym of "argent".  This interpretation has neither been accepted nor refuted by any heraldic authority, but a counter-argument is that the labels are not intended to represent a heraldic tincture, but are in fact white labels proper.

Other exceptional colours have occasionally appeared during the twentieth and twenty-first centuries:

The arms of the Jewish Autonomous Region in Russia have a field of aquamarine.

The Canadian Heraldic Authority granted arms containing rose as a colour in 1997.  In 2002, the Authority granted arms including copper, treated as a metal, to the municipality of Whitehorse, Yukon.

Ochre, both red and yellow, appears in South African heraldry; the national coat of arms, adopted in 2000, includes red ochre, while (yellow) ochre appears in the arms of the University of Transkei.

In the United States, heraldry is not governed by any official authority; but the United States Army, which makes extensive use of heraldry, does have its own authority, the United States Army Institute of Heraldry.  The armorial designs of the Institute of Heraldry include a number of novel tinctures, including buff (employed variously as either a metal or a colour), and horizon blue.  Silver gray has appeared in the heraldry of both the Army and the Air Force.  Bronze appears as a colour in the arms of the Special Troops Battalion of the 2nd Brigade, 1st Cavalry Division. There seems to be some confusion about the colour crimson, as in some cases it is treated as a separate tincture, while in others it is used to specify the shade of gules to be employed by the artist. Similar issue exists about a blue-green colour referred to as teal or turquoise which is either treated separate or as a specific shade of azure or céleste. Differing from most heraldic practice, the Institute of Heraldry often specifies the exact shades to be used in depicting various arms.

Buff is also used by the Canadian Heraldic Authority, who treat it as a colour.

Proper
A charge that is coloured as it naturally appears is blazoned proper (Fr. ), or "the colour of nature".  Strictly speaking, proper is not a tincture in itself, and if, as is sometimes the case, a charge is meant to be depicted in particular colours that are not apparent from the word "proper" alone, they may be specified in whatever detail is necessary.  Certain charges are considered "proper" when portrayed with particular colours, even though a range of different colours is found in nature; for instance, a popinjay proper is green, even though wild parrots occur in a variety of colours. In some cases, a charge depicted in a particular set of colours may be referred to as "proper", even though it consists entirely of heraldic tinctures; a rose proper, whether red or white, is barbed vert and seeded or.

In French-heraldry Carnation is often used to specify that (the exposed parts of) human figures should be drawn realistically-shaded.

The most extensive use of non-heraldic colours is probably associated with "landscape heraldry", a common feature of British and German armory during the latter part of the eighteenth century, and the early part of the nineteenth.  Although rarely used for the field itself, landscapes were often granted as augmentations, typically depicting a fortress successfully captured or defended, or a particular ship, or a battle in which the armiger to whom the augmentation was granted was involved.  Such landscapes, usually appearing on a chief, might be blazoned with great particularity as to the things portrayed and the colours used to portray them.  Officially, these landscapes appeared on a field of argent, but it was common, and perhaps expected, for the artist to add further details, such as the sky and clouds, by which the field might be wholly obscured.  The use of landscapes in heraldry fell out of fashion during the Victorian era, when heraldic scholars and artists began looking to earlier and simpler periods of armorial design for inspiration.

Terminology
In the English-speaking world, heraldic terminology is based largely on that of British armory, which in turn is based on Norman French. With respect to the heraldic tinctures, French heraldry, which is often cited by heraldic authors, uses similar terminology. However, German heraldry, also highly influential, uses a different vocabulary; it calls the colours by their everyday names.

In its original sense, tincture refers only to the group conventionally referred to as "colours". But as the word "colour" seems inapplicable to the heraldic furs, and no other term clearly encompasses all three classes, the word "tincture" has come to be used in this broader sense, while "colour" has acquired the more restricted sense originally given to "tincture". Thus, when consulting various heraldic authorities, care must be taken to determine which meaning each term is given.

Designations

Artistic liberties
In most heraldic tradition, the various metals and colours have no fixed appearance, hue, or shade.  The heraldic artist is free to choose a lighter or darker blue or green, a deeper or brighter red; to choose between depicting or with yellow or any of various gold paints, to depict argent as white or silver.  Recently the College of Arms explained, "there are no fixed shades for heraldic colours. If the official description of a coat of arms gives its tinctures as Gules (red), Azure (blue) and Argent (white or silver) then, as long as the blue is not too light and the red not too orange, purple or pink, it is up to the artists to decide which particular shades they think are appropriate."

In blazoning

Most heraldic authors do not capitalize the names of the various tinctures, although a few do (sometimes inconsistently), and some who do not capitalize the other tinctures recommend capitalizing or in order to avoid confusion with the conjunction.  However, there are relatively few occasions in which the conjunction "or" would appear in the blazon of a coat of arms, and if properly worded, which meaning is intended should be readily apparent from the context.  Another convention has been to capitalize only the first word or the first tincture appearing in the blazon, but no other words.  In the elaborate calligraphy appearing on most grants of arms, all of the tinctures are capitalized, as indeed are the names of the charges, but this is purely a matter of decorative style, and in no way does the manner of capitalization used in the original grant affect how the arms may be described on other occasions.

A long-standing heraldic tradition has been to avoid repeating the names of tinctures multiple times in any given blazon. If it is possible to mention multiple charges of the same tincture at once, followed by the name of the tincture, then this problem is avoided, but when it is impossible to combine elements of the same tincture in this manner, more creative descriptions may be used.  For example, instead of "gules, on a fess or between three chess-rooks argent, a lion passant gules, armed and langued argent", one might say, "gules, on a fess or between three chess-rooks argent, a lion passant of the field, armed and langued of the third."  Similar phrases include "of the last" and "of the like".  Alternately, descriptions such as "gold" and "silver" might be substituted for "or" and "argent" on a subsequent occurrence. Another rule of blazon relating to tinctures suggests the placing of a comma after each occurrence of a tincture.

In recent years, the College of Arms has regularly dispensed with many of these practices, believing them to cause confusion, and in new grants of arms, the names of tinctures are repeated on each instance that they occur.  The names of all tinctures and charges are capitalized, although the word "proper", indicating the colour of nature, is not, and internal commas are entirely omitted.

Rule of tincture

The first so-called "rule" of heraldry is the rule of tincture: metal should not be placed upon metal, nor colour upon colour, for the sake of contrast.

The main duty of a heraldic device is to be recognized, and the dark colours or light metals are supposed to be too difficult to distinguish if they are placed on top of other dark or light colours, particularly in poor light. Though this is the practical genesis of the rule, the rule is technical and appearance is not used in determining whether arms conform to the rule. Another reason sometimes given to justify this rule is that it was difficult to paint enamel colours over other enamel colours, or with metal over metal.

This "rule" has at times been followed so pedantically that arms that violate it were called  "false arms" or  "arms of enquiry"; any violation was presumed to be intentional, to the point that one was supposed to enquire how it came to pass. One of the most famous  was the shield of the Kingdom of Jerusalem, which had gold crosses on silver. This use of white and gold together is also seen on the arms of the King of Jerusalem, the flag and arms of the Vatican, and the bishop's mitre in the arms of Andorra. These uses of gold on silver indicate the exceptional holy and special status of these coats of arms. An example of "colour on colour" is the arms of Albania, with its sable two-headed eagle on a gules field.

The "rule of tincture" has had an influence reaching far beyond heraldry. It has been applied to the design of flags, so that the flag of Saxe-Weimar-Eisenach was modified to conform to the rule.

Counterchanging
When a charge or group of charges is placed across a division line, variation, or ordinary, it may be counterchanged (Fr. , but modern , Ger.  or ), meaning that the charges are divided the same way as the field upon which they rest, with the colours reversed.

In the municipal arms of Behnsdorf, Saxony-Anhalt, seen above, the field is divided with the left half white (argent) and the right half green (vert), and the counterchanged tree is green where it lies on the white part of the field, and white where it lies on the green part.

The flag of Maryland is another example of counterchanging. The only U.S. state flag to be directly based on English heraldry, it is the arms of George Calvert, 1st Baron Baltimore, who founded the colony of Maryland in 1632. In the 1st and 4th quarters, the field is divided into six vertical bands of gold (or) and black (sable) with a diagonal band (a bend) in which the colours are reversed (i.e., the bend is counterchanged). The 2nd and 3rd quarters are themselves quartered between white (argent) and red (gules) with a counterchanged cross bottony that is red where it lies on the white part of the field and white where it lies on the red part of the field.

Counterchanging is rare in early heraldry; early examples from German heraldry are found in the late fifteenth-century Wernigerode Armorial; it becomes more frequently applied from the seventeenth century onward, especially with the substantial number of newly created coats of arms, of which some notable examples include Baron Baltimore (1624), Nightingale baronets (1628), Barrett-Lennard baronets (1801), Verney baronets (1818), and Baron Alvingham (1929).

In Scottish heraldry, charges are sometimes blazoned as counterchanged of different colours from the fieldfor instance, per fess gules and azure, a sun in splendour counterchanged or and of the first.  A more typical blazon for this would be per fess gules and azure, a sun in splendour per fess or and of the first.

The term countercoloured is sometimes used in place of counterchanged. The arms of the Fenwick baronets were originally blazoned as silver, a chief gules with six martlets countercoloured. In this case, three martlets argent rest on a chief gules, while three martlets gules rest on the argent field. Some heraldic authorities regard the use of this term as erroneous.

Monochromatic presentation

Hatching

During the first half of the seventeenth century, the proliferation of the printing press coupled with the persistence of difficulties in and expense of colour printing prompted the development of a number of systems of hatching for the purpose of depicting heraldic designs without the use of colour.  Intended chiefly for printing and engraving, the system which eventually gained widespread acceptance was that of Silvestro de Petra Sancta, a Jesuit priest and heraldic scholar, originally published in 1638.

In Petra Sancta's method, illustrated in the table above, a separate hatching represents each metal and colour, while the furs are treated as combinations of metal and colour.  Argent is represented by a plain field, while or is represented by a field strewn with dots.  Gules is represented by vertical lines, azure by horizontal lines, and sable by a combination of horizontal and vertical lines.  Diagonal lines running from dexter chief to sinister base represent vert, while purpure is the reverse, represented by diagonal lines running from sinister chief to dexter base.  Sanguine is represented by diagonal lines running in each direction, while tenné is represented by a combination of horizontal lines and diagonal lines running from sinister chief to dexter base.

Nine additional hatchings, published by Marcus Vulson de la Colombière in 1639, were intended to represent other colours, although none of them correspond with regular heraldic tinctures, and they have never been used in British armory.  A combination of vertical lines with diagonal lines running from dexter chief to sinister base represents brown; blood red is represented by vertical lines combined with diagonal lines running from sinister chief to dexter base; earth-colour by horizontal and vertical lines combined with diagonal lines running from dexter chief to sinister base; iron-grey by diagonal lines running in each direction (the same as sanguine in Petra Sancta's system); water-colour by broken horizontal lines; flesh-colour by broken vertical lines; ashen-grey by a combination of broken horizontal and broken diagonal lines; orange by broken vertical lines interspersed with dots; and the colour of nature by zig-zag lines running from dexter chief to sinister base.

Tricking

Before the use of hatching to depict individual heraldic tinctures, it was common to label colours in heraldic designs with abbreviations, a practice known as "tricking", when colours were unavailable.  The arms would be drawn in outline, and the tinctures written in abbreviated form: O or or for or; A, ar, or arg for argent, G or gu for gules; S or sa for sable; Az or B for azure (B for "blue" being used in older trickings to avoid confusion between ar and az); Vt for vert, Purp for purpure, and Pr for proper.  Although most records of the College of Arms are in colour, the practice of tricking is used in all other cases, even after the widespread adoption of hatching for printing and engraving arms.

These abbreviations may be either capitalized or lowercase.

Poetic representation

Heraldry has been influenced by allegorical and astrological views, including the idea of sympathies and antipathies among stars, minerals, animals, plants, and people. Some tinctures were considered to represent astrological symbols.

The lore of sympathies originated with the Babylonians, who saw gems and rare minerals as the concentrates of cosmic powers.  Later, Pliny the Elder's Natural History organized nature according to a system of sympathies and antipathies among species and other elements of the natural world. This doctrine influenced medieval medicine, pharmacy, alchemy and also heraldry. During the 1350s, the work of Bartolo de Sassoferrato (1313/1314–1357) linked Or to the sun, Azure to the element air, and Gules to the element fire. Honoré Bonet, a heraldist from Provence, declared in his work Arbre des Batailles (1387) that the metal gold (Or) is the noblest in the world because, due to its very nature, it is bright and shining and full of virtues. During the late medieval period and Renaissance, there was an occasional practice of blazoning tinctures by gemstones, or by references to the seven classical "planets" (including the sun and the moon).

The work of Bonet influenced the 15th century Burgundian heraldist Jean Courtois (d. 1436), also known as the Sicily Herald. In his work Le Blason des Couleurs (1414), Courtois developed a heraldic system consisting of the tinctures, planets and carbuncles, together with the virtues, metals, months, the zodiac, and weekdays. His main contribution was the development of a gemstone-planetary blazon that related colour to gemstone to planet: or, topaz, the sun; argent, pearl, the moon; gules, ruby, Mars; sable, diamond, Saturn; azure, sapphire, Jupiter; vert, emerald, Venus; purpure, amethyst, Mercury; tenné, jacinth, dragon's head (ascending lunar node); sanguine/murrey, sardonyx, dragon's tail (descending lunar node).

The dragon's head (also called Anabibazon in astronomy and astrology) and dragon's tail (also called Catabibazon) were in use from ancient times. In heraldry the dragon's head symbolizes a light colour (tenné), and dragon's tail symbolizes a dark colour (sanguine). In alchemy the dragon's head is the materia prima that is subjected to transmutation to produce the philosopher's stone. During the process of transmutation the light-coloured starting material is transformed to a darker and more reddish one. In astrology the dragon's head is connected to good luck, while the dragon's tail is unlucky. These links indicate that heraldry in the 15th century was strongly under the influence of magical views and alchemistic ideas, which were in turn connected to the lore of sympathies between colours, planets, gemstones, metals, virtues etc. 

The work of Jean Courtois was distributed in manuscripts and later in one of the first books printed in French. During the Tudor and Stuart dynasties in England (1485–1702), it appeared in heraldry manuals. In his book Traité du blason (1465), Clément Prinsault deals with the relation of colours to the virtues, the seven planets, the 12 celestial signs, gemstones, weekdays, the three elements etc. This book is among the earliest writings on heraldry available today.

The English historian and heraldist Sir Henry Spelman (1564–1641) used the symbols of the planets to designate tinctures in his 1654 book Aspilogia. Sir John Ferne (d. 1609) enumerates 14 different methods of blazon: 1. by colours;  2. by planets;  3. by precious stones;  4. by virtues;  5. by celestial signs;  6. by the months of the year;  7. by the days of the week; 8. by the ages of man; 9. by flowers; 10. by the elements; 11. by the seasons of the year; 12. by the complexions of man; 13. by numbers; and 14. by metals.

As well as the main tinctures, tricking abbreviations for other tinctures such as Proper – ppr, pp, Ermine – er etc. existed in English and some other languages during the Renaissance. To designate carnation (carnea tinctura), the zodiac sign of Leo was used in reverse. German heraldry used trefoil to designate colours other than the seven main tinctures (""). Spener (1717. p. 113) also linked tenné and sanguine to the zodiac sign of Leo . Rudolphi also refers to trefoil (♣) as a designation of colour vert, usually connected with Venus. He also assigned specific variants of astrological signs for dragon's head and dragon's tail (☊ ☋), derived from the sign for Leo, to the tinctures orange and carnation, respectively.

Ultimately, a system of nine tinctures was developed, with dukes, earls, and barons having their arms blazoned by gemstones, and princes, kings and emperors having arms blazoned by the planets. It is worth noting that the Austrian troubadour and herald Peter Suchenwirt (c. 1320 – 1395) used gemstones to designate the tinctures even earlier (c. 1355) in the coat of arms of the Hungarian king Louis the Great (1342–1382). Konrad von Würzburg (c. 1230 – 1287) also mentioned coats of arms made of gemstones in his poem Turnier von Nantheiz (c. 1258), for example describing the arms of the king of England as an escutcheon covered with Arabian gold with leopards made of rubies (lines 310–320).

Footnotes

References

Bibliography

External links

Heraldic tinctures
Color in culture
Heraldry